The Detroit Ignition were an American indoor soccer team that has played three seasons, most recently 2008–09.

In April 2006, Greg Bibb, president of Hantz Group Sports and Entertainment, introduced the teams as a new Major Indoor Soccer League expansion team.  They played at the Compuware Sports Arena in Plymouth Township, Michigan.  Their first season was 2006–07 MISL season. 

After the 2007–08 MISL season, the league folded.  Soon afterwards, the Ignition joined the Xtreme Soccer League. The Ignition ended the 2008–09 campaign in first place which netted them the XSL title.  The XSL went on "hiatus" after one season.

Year-by-year

Roster
As of 16th of January, 2009

Head coaches
  Mark Pulisic (2006–2007)
  Bob Lilley (2007–2008)
  Matt Johnson (2008–2009)

Arenas
 Compuware Arena (2006–09)

Television
For the 2007–2008 season, 11 Detroit Ignition games were televised by Comcast Local, a Midwest sports network based in Michigan and Indiana. Also four games were shown on Fox Soccer Channel.
For the 2008–2009 season, 10 Detroit Ignition games were televised by Comcast Local.  All games were live on b2 Network.

External links
 Official site

References

Xtreme Soccer League teams
Association football clubs established in 2006
I
Soccer clubs in Michigan
Indoor soccer clubs in the United States
Major Indoor Soccer League (2001–2008) teams
2006 establishments in Michigan
Defunct indoor soccer clubs in the United States
2009 disestablishments in Michigan
Sports in Plymouth Township, Michigan
Association football clubs disestablished in 2009